Decker Island is a small island in the Sacramento-San Joaquin River delta, in California. It is part of Solano County.

References

Islands of Solano County, California
Islands of the Sacramento–San Joaquin River Delta
Islands of Northern California